Tai Ping Koon Restaurant (TPK) is a restaurant in Hong Kong. In 2018 it had four restaurants there. Chris Dwyer of the South China Morning Post described it as "one of the world’s oldest continually operating Chinese restaurants".

History
Chui Lo Ko established it in 1860 as a restaurant serving Western cuisine, modified to suit tastes of Chinese customers, in Canton (Guangzhou). Dwyer stated that it had a reputation as "a fine-dining restaurant" with famous people as customers. The Canton location occupied a four storey facility.

The first Hong Kong location opened in Sheung Wan in 1938. It became a solely Hong Kong franchise when the Canton location closed in 1956, as the Chinese government confiscated private property.

Currently in Guangzhou there is a Taiping Guan Restaurant. Dongjiang Restaurants began running the restaurant by 2003. By 2005 Hong Kong Tai Ping Koon manager Andrew Chui Shek-on took control of the restaurant.

In 2016 it had restaurants in Central, Causeway Bay, and Kowloon, four in total.

Sun Yat-sen, Chiang Kai-shek, Chow Yun-fat, and Ho Chi Minh ate at at least one of the outlets of Tai Ping Koon. HK Magazine in 2016 ranked it as #8 of "Hong Kong's 10 Most Iconic Restaurants".

Cuisine
Its dishes became known as "Soy Sauce Western" as soy sauce is a key ingredient. The restaurant states that the dish Swiss wings originates from there. As of 2016, in all of the TPK restaurants, Swiss wings are the most common item among customers, and Dwyer stated that it Swiss wings are "Arguably [Tai Ping Koon's] most famous dish".

References

External links

 Tai Ping Koon

Restaurants in Hong Kong
Guangzhou
1860 establishments in China